Ivo Trumbić (2 April 1935 – 12 March 2021) was a Croatian water polo player and Olympic medallist. He later went on to manage. Ivo Trumbić coached the Netherlands to a bronze medal at the 1976 Summer Olympics, becoming one of the few sportspeople who won Olympic medals in water polo as players and head coaches.

Career 
According to the Netherlands men's national water polo team, Trumbic was not only national coach of Orange in two periods, but he also worked as a coach and technical director for a long time at AC&PC from Amersfoort. The Croat, who conquered Olympic silver (1964) and gold (1968) as a water polo player with the former Yugoslavia.

Trumbic was inducted into the Swimming World’s International Hall of Fame in 2015. The Royal Dutch Swimming Federation appointed him a member of merit in 2018, and in 2020 he received the Franjo Bučar Lifetime Achievement Award, Croatia’s most important sports prize.

Ivo Trumbic  died on 12 March, 2021 at the age of 85.

See also
 Yugoslavia men's Olympic water polo team records and statistics
 Netherlands men's Olympic water polo team records and statistics
 List of Olympic champions in men's water polo
 List of Olympic medalists in water polo (men)
 List of members of the International Swimming Hall of Fame

References

External links
 

1935 births
2021 deaths
Water polo players from Split, Croatia
Croatian male water polo players
Yugoslav male water polo players
Olympic water polo players of Yugoslavia
Water polo players at the 1964 Summer Olympics
Water polo players at the 1968 Summer Olympics
Medalists at the 1964 Summer Olympics
Medalists at the 1968 Summer Olympics
Olympic gold medalists for Yugoslavia
Olympic silver medalists for Yugoslavia
Olympic medalists in water polo
Croatian water polo coaches
Netherlands men's national water polo team coaches
Water polo coaches at the 1976 Summer Olympics
Olympiacos Water Polo Club coaches
Burials at Mirogoj Cemetery